The Oncenter is a three-building convention and entertainment complex in Downtown Syracuse, New York, United States. It is composed of a convention center, sporting arena, and theaters.

Nicholas J. Pirro Convention Center 
The Nicholas J. Pirro Convention Center, which opened in 1992, consists of 99,000 square feet (9,200 square meters) of rentable space. It is attached to a 1,000-car parking garage. The convention center is named after Nicholas J. Pirro, 20-year executive of Onondaga County.

Upstate Medical University Arena 

Upstate Medical University Arena at Onondaga County War Memorial is a 6,230-seat multi-purpose arena that has been home to Syracuse's former NBA team, the Syracuse Nationals, as well as several minor-league hockey, football, and lacrosse teams. Since 1994, it has been home to the Syracuse Crunch of the American Hockey League.

John H. Mulroy Civic Center Theaters 
The John H. Mulroy Civic Center Theaters at The Oncenter are home to the Syracuse Opera Company. The Crouse-Hinds Theater, the main theater of the center, contains one of the largest stages in Upstate New York and seats 2,117, on three tiers. The other two theaters are the Carrier Theater, with 463 seats, and the Bevard Studio, with 162 seats.

References

External links 

 

Buildings and structures in Syracuse, New York
Convention centers in New York (state)
Indoor arenas in New York (state)
Culture of Syracuse, New York
Tourist attractions in Syracuse, New York
Sports venues in Syracuse, New York